The Roman Catholic Diocese of Vitoria is a diocese located in the city of Vitoria-Gasteiz in the Ecclesiastical province of Burgos in Spain.

History

 September 8, 1861: Established as Diocese of Vitoria from the Metropolitan Archdiocese of Burgos, Diocese of Calahorra y La Calzada and Diocese of Pamplona–Tudela

Special churches

Former Cathedral:
Catedral vieja de Santa María, Vitoria, Álava, País Vasco
 Minor Basilica:
 BVM, Vitoria, Álava, País Vasco

Leadership
 Bishops of Vitoria (Roman rite)
 Bishop Juan Carlos Elizalde Espinal, (2016.01.08 – Present)
 Bishop Miguel José Asurmendi Aramendía, S.D.B. (1995.09.08 - 2016.01.08)
 Bishop José María Larrauri Lafuente (1979.02.16 – 1995.09.08)
 Bishop Francisco Peralta y Ballabriga (1955.01.10 – 1978.07.10)
 Cardinal José María Bueno y Monreal (1950.05.13 – 1954.10.27)
 Archbishop Carmelo Ballester y Nieto, C.M. (1943.06.10 – 1948.10.09)
 Bishop Mateo Múgica y Urrestarazu (1928.03.10 – 1937.10.12)
 Archbishop Zacarías Martínez Núñez, O.S.A. (1922.12.14 – 1927.12.02)
 Patriarch Leopoldo Eijo y Garay (1917.03.22 – 1922.12.14)
 Archbishop Prudencio Melo y Alcalde (1913.07.18 – 1916.12.04)
 Archbishop José Cadena y Eleta (1904.11.14 – 1913.07.18)
 Bishop Ramón Fernández Piérola y Lopez de Luzuriaca (1889.12.30 – 1904.01.25)
 Archbishop Mariano Miguel Gómez Alguacil y Fernández (1880.12.16 – 1889.12.30)
 Cardinal Sebastián Herrero y Espinosa de los Monteros, C.O. (1876.12.18 – 1880.06)
 Bishop Diego Mariano Alguacil Rodríguez (1861.12.23 – 1876.12.18)

See also
Roman Catholicism in Spain

Sources
 GCatholic.org
 Catholic Hierarchy
 Diocese website

Roman Catholic dioceses in Spain
Religious organizations established in 1861
Vitoria-Gasteiz
Álava
Roman Catholic dioceses and prelatures established in the 19th century
1861 establishments in Spain